Washington's 16th legislative district is one of forty-nine districts in Washington state for representation in the state legislature.

The district includes Columbia and Walla Walla counties, most of southern Benton County, and Pasco.

This largely rural district is represented by state senator Perry Dozier and state representatives Mark Klicker (position 1) and Skyler Rude (position 2), all Republicans.

See also
Washington Redistricting Commission
Washington State Legislature
Washington State Senate
Washington House of Representatives

References

External links
Washington State Redistricting Commission
Washington House of Representatives
Map of Legislative Districts

16